Holland's Pies is a manufacturer of pies and puddings based in Baxenden, near Accrington in Lancashire, England. Owned by 2 Sisters Food Group, the company also produces pasties and sausage rolls.

History 

Holland's was founded by father and daughter John and Sarah Whittaker in 1851, as a confectioners shop in Haslingden, Lancashire. Sarah married Richard Holland in 1869, taking control of the business and renaming it Walter Holland and Sons. In 1907, the business moved to a much larger bakery in Baxenden, from where pies were delivered locally by horse and cart.

Delivery vans were first introduced in 1927, with the company moving to its current premises two years later. By 1938, there was a fleet of twenty vans making regular deliveries around the North West. Cake production ended at the bakery, due to sugar rationing during World War II, and meat pies became more popular.

After the war, in 1946, the decision was taken to sell the company to R.Gummer Ltd., a provisions firm of London and Liverpool. Holland’s was bought out by Pork Farms in 1972, who in turn were bought by Northern Foods in 1979. Holland's thus became part of one of the major food manufacturing groups in the United Kingdom.

Remaining part of the Northern Foods portfolio, following the sale of Pork Farms to Vision Capital in January 2007, Holland's pies and puddings are sold at 85% of chip shops in North West England.

Products 
These are the products currently manufactured by Holland's:

Pies 
Just steak
Steak and kidney
Potato and meat
Meat (beef and pork)
Cheese and onion
Chicken and mushroom
Lancashire Hotpot
Pork
Chicken tikka
Peppered steak
Steak and Guinness
Beef and onion
Chicken and ham
Potato, cheese and onion
Chicken balti

Pasties 
Cornish pasty
Cheese and Onion
Beef and Vegetable
Corned beef

Others 
Sausage rolls
Steak and kidney puddings

Football
The pies are sold on matchdays at northern football clubs including Manchester City, Huddersfield Town, Stockport County, Bradford City, Bolton Wanderers, Blackburn Rovers and Blackpool. They were endorsed by celebrity chef and Norwich City F.C. director, Delia Smith in July 2000, who introduced them to Carrow Road.

In June 2007, Holland's signed a two year club record shirt sponsorship deal with local team Burnley F.C. As part of the deal, Holland's Pies are sold on matchdays at Turf Moor.

Endorsements
Celebrities who have endorsed Holland's Pies include chef Delia Smith, radio presenters Mark Radcliffe and Marc Riley, Cilla Black, Peter Kay and Wayne Hemingway.

References

External links

British pie brands
Companies based in Hyndburn
Food and drink companies established in 1854
Food and drink companies of England
Northern Foods
British companies established in 1854